NCAA Season 75 is the 1999–2000 season of the National Collegiate Athletic Association (Philippines), which was hosted by Jose Rizal College.

This NCAA games were broadcast by Vintage Television on  IBC 13 the fifth and final consecutive season. Vintage was the first official broadcaster for NCAA games in 1995 (with PTV-4).

Basketball

Elimination round

Men's playoffs
*Match abandoned with Letran leading 83-60.

See also
 UAAP Season 62

1999 in multi-sport events
75
2000 in multi-sport events
1999 in Philippine sport
2000 in Philippine sport